The Cummins B Series is a family of diesel engines produced by American manufacturer Cummins.  In production since 1984, the B series engine family is intended for multiple applications on and off-highway, light-duty, and medium-duty.  In the automotive industry, it is best known for its use in school buses, public service buses (most commonly the Dennis Dart and the Alexander Dennis Enviro400) in the United Kingdom, and Dodge/Ram pickup trucks.

Since its introduction, three generations of the B series engine have been produced, offered in both inline-four and inline-six configurations in multiple displacements.

General engine features
The B-series features engine bores machined directly into the block (rather than the wet liners used on earlier Cummins engines). It is also set apart by the use of a shallow one-piece head, requiring closer tolerances than in other Cummins products. Unlike other diesel engines of the time; the B-series Cummins used direct injection and did not need glow plugs.  The engine was first manufactured in Rocky Mount, North Carolina, and other plants were later added in Mexico, Brazil, Turkey, and Darlington, UK.

Every Cummins powered Dodge Pickup (since initial production in 1989) has come equipped with a turbocharger. It uses a gear-drive camshaft for extra reliability. Also specified is a deep-skirt engine block and extra-strong connecting rods. A Holset turbocharger is used. The original B Series was updated with 24 valves and an electronic engine management system to become the ISB in 1998.

Engine specifications

B Engine

3.9L
The 3.9L 4B/4BT/4BTA Cummins is categorized under the B Engine family alongside the 5.9L 6B/6BT/6BTA Cummins diesel engines. The 3.9L is an inline four-cylinder naturally aspirated (4B) or turbodiesel (4BT/4BTA) that was popular for many step van applications, including bread vans and other commercial vehicles. Additionally it has seen broad usage in agricultural equipment. It has also gained popularity as an engine swap into smaller trucks and SUVs.

4B 
The lowest powered, naturally aspirated 3.9L Cummins, the 4B, produces . This variant is most commonly found in equipment such as generators and wood chippers.

4BT 
The 4BT is one of two turbocharged variants of the 3.9L B-Series engine. It contains two valves per cylinder for a total of eight. The most common output of this variant is 105 horsepower.

4BTA 
The 4BTA is the updated version of the 4BT, also turbocharged, containing four valves per cylinder for a total of sixteen. The most common output of this variant is 170 horsepower.

5.9L

The 5.9L Cummins, also known as the "12-Valve" Cummins was the first member of the Cummins B-Series to be used in a light truck vehicle. The 6BT used Bosch fuel systems, injector, and VE rotary pump and P7100 inline injection pumps. Some early 6BTs were supplied with CAV rotary pumps instead, before the Bosch system became the sole standard. This engine started life in 1984 designed as an agricultural engine, for use in Case agricultural equipment.
After 1989, the 6BT engine was used in light duty, medium duty and select heavy duty trucks and buses. The 6BT engine has recently become very popular for use in repowering various vehicles.

6B 
The 6B is the naturally aspirated version of the 6BT with the power output of between 150 and 173 hp and with the compression ratio of 19:1.There were no automotive 6B engines.

6BT 
Appearing in the 1989–1998 Dodge Ram pickup truck, it became a popular alternative to the large gasoline V8 engines normally used in full-size pickup trucks, since it produced torque at low engine RPM, and achieved significantly better fuel mileage. During that time, the Dodge RAM was the only diesel pickup that did not rely on glowplugs for cold weather starting due to indirect fueling.

6BTA

ISB Engine

4.5L ISB

5.9L ISB 

The  ISB (Interact System B) is one of the largest straight-six engines used for light truck vehicles and school buses, and the improved high output 600 version was on the Ward's 10 Best Engines list for 2004.

One unusual feature of the ISB is that it is a multi-valve pushrod engine design, with four valves per cylinder (popularly referred to as the "24-Valve" Cummins). The engine displaces , with a  cylinder bore and piston stroke. A turbocharger is used to increase the output in the high-compression (17.2:1 in recent versions) diesel. It is an all-iron engine with forged steel connecting rods, an assembled camshaft, and a cast aluminum intake manifold. The engine is produced in Columbus, Indiana.

The ISB uses electronically controlled Bosch fuel systems, unlike the 6BT systems which were mechanical. Early ISB engines utilize Bosch injectors and a Bosch VP44 high pressure pump. Later ISB designs have common rail fuel injection, Bosch injectors, and a Bosch CP3 high pressure pump.

Dodge Ram ISB
Midway through model year 1998, the Dodge Ram switched from the 6BT to the ISB to meet updated emissions requirements. Like other ISB's, these engines started out using the Bosch VP44 rotary injection pump. The VP44 setup meant that timing and fuel could be precisely controlled, which led to cleaner emissions. However, VP44 failure rates were higher than the older P7100 injection pump. The compression ratio in these engines was 17.2:1. For the 2001–2002 years, a standard output and a high output ISB Cummins engine were offered. The high output engine was different in a few ways from the standard output engine; it had higher compression (17.3:1), powdered metal valve seat inserts, a larger flywheel, the Bosch fuel system was reworked to allow higher fuel flows, and fuel-injection timing was altered.

Dodge Ram ISB CR
For the 2003 model year, the Cummins was introduced with Bosch high pressure common rail fuel injection, again increasing power output. On automatic equipped vehicles, the 47RE was upgraded internally to increase durability and torque capacity, now known as the 48RE. This engine was noticeably quieter than the previous engines.

6.7 ISB

The 6.7L ISB is the latest version of the B Series. It is currently the largest straight-six engine produced for a light duty truck, school bus.

For 2020 this engine has been updated to produce 400 hp and 1000 ft-lb torque.

It is also used in the Blue Bird Vision, Thomas Saf-T-Liner C2, and IC CE school buses

Changes over the 5.9L ISB
There are many changes over the previous 5.9L ISB for the Dodge truck, the most obvious being the larger displacement.

With the 6.7L ISB came the introduction of the Variable Geometry Turbocharger (VGT). The VG Turbocharger was introduced to reduce turbo lag by adjusting the vanes by sliding a steel ring in the exhaust housing dependent on engine RPM creating more or less pressure inside the exhaust housing and controlling the speed of the turbocharger. It also works as an integrated exhaust brake system and is all controlled by an electronic actuator on the turbocharger. This VGT system has been an extremely common issue with the 6.7L ISB and is typically diagnosed by the loss of the trucks exhaust brake.

QSB Engine

5.9 QSB 
The 5.9L QSB (Quantum System B) is an off-road, heavy duty version of the ISB. Typically used in marine, agricultural, and construction applications, these engines share many of the same parts as the ISB and utilize the same Bosch fuel system.

Fuel system

Mechanical injection with mechanical timing 
In the earlier models of the Cummins B-Series Engine, it was almost entirely mechanical including its fuel system. The fuel pump used in these engines was the Bosch P7100 injection pump, this pump is driven off the camshaft gear and drives its own internal camshaft to inject fuel to the individual injectors. This pump itself was one of the most popular options for fueling for the B-Series Engines because of this simplistic design and how reliable it was. The P7100 injection pump also allows for large amounts of fuel to be delivered into the system with simple tweaking to the system to allow for larger injection events.

Mechanical injection with electronic timing 
In the later models of B-Series Engine, the fuel system was switched from mechanical injection and timing to mechanical injection with electronic timing. This was all thanks to Bosch's new VP44 injection pump. The VP44 injection pump is driven at half the camshaft speed and produces fuel pressure at about 4,500 psi to pop the vertically centered injectors in the engine.  These injection pumps need to have constant fuel pressure behind them of at least 10psi at all times to maintain the priming of the system. If you run these pumps dry it can cause your pump to fail quickly. The VP44 injection pumps were the first pumps placed in the Cummins engine to have an FPCM. FPCM stands for the fuel pressure control module, and this is responsible for maintaining and controlling the fuel pressure of the system. However, even though this new technology to control fuel pressure was convenient, it had a major downfall. The problem was that they were unable to be serviced without replacing the entire fuel pump. Another important piece of the puzzle that is responsible for the longevity and functionality of the VP44 was the fuel transfer pump mounted on the side of the block next to the ECM. This electronically driven vane pump is what supplies that minimum of 10psi to the injection pump so it maintains constant fuel pressure as well, as cools itself, and lubricates itself.

Mechanical injection with electronic timing and common rail pressurization 
The most recent method of fuel injection that is still in use today is called common rail injection. Common rail injection is a completely revolutionary design to fuel injection since a fuel pump is now used to pressurize a rail and then from there sends the fuel to each injector. A major benefit of switching over to this fueling system was how it allowed for much less leakage into the cylinders pre and post ignition. This is all possible since this fuel system operated upwards of 2600 bar so they are able to set spring tension higher in each injector to allow for more precise fuel injection and timing. Another benefit of using common rail injection and having one rail pressurized compared to pressurizing each individual injector is that it is more reliable since it allows for more consistent fuel delivery to each injector.

References

Chrysler engines
Cummins diesel engines
Diesel engines by model
Straight-six engines